Vancouver is the debut EP by the band La Dispute, released April 14, 2006. This was the first release the band made under their new label Friction Records after signing with them in 2004.

Track listing

Personnel
La Dispute
 Jordan Dreyer – vocals, lyrics
 Brad Vander Lugt – drums, keyboards, percussion
 Derek Sterenberg – guitar
 Kevin Whittemore – guitar
 Adam Kool – bass, additional guitars

Additional personnel
Peter DeGraw – production

References

2006 EPs
La Dispute (band) EPs